Yellow Pages Limited (formerly Yellow Pages Income Fund and Yellow Media) is a Canadian publication and internet services company that owns and operates Canadian properties and publications including Yellow Pages directories, YellowPages.ca, and Canada411.ca. Its online destinations reach approximately 9 million of unique visitors monthly and its mobile applications for finding local citizens, downloaded over 3 million times. The company was founded following the buyout of Bell Canada's directory business and subsequently acquired SuperPages Canada, the directory publisher for Telus.

In October 2008, Yellow Pages was named one of "Canada's Top 100 Employers" by Mediacorp Canada Inc. and was featured in Maclean's newsmagazine, the only directory publisher to receive this honour.

In March 2011, Yellow Pages sold Trader Corporation to funds advised by Apax Partners for $745 million. Its ticker symbol changed from YLO to Y in 2012.

On January 16, 2018, it was announced that Yellow Pages would cut 18% otherwise, one fifth of its workforce. That very same day, approximately 500 employees were laid off nation-wide. According to its new CEO David Eckert, such measures were essential to ensure short-term financial health of the company, whose stock price took a significant nosedive over the year 2016–2017.

Its headquarters is located at 1751 Richardson Street in Montreal, Québec.

Dividend controversy

Yellow Media is considered by some Canadian financial writers to be a prime example of why investors should be skeptical of high dividend yields.  In 2011, the company maintained a high dividend yield despite close scrutiny, before finally cutting dividends and taking a stock price hit.

References

External links
Yellow Pages Group
YellowPages.ca
PagesJaunes.ca
Canadaplus.ca

Companies listed on the Toronto Stock Exchange
Companies based in Montreal
Telephone directory publishing companies
Private equity portfolio companies
Yellow pages